Brooklyn is an unincorporated community in Conecuh County, Alabama, United States. Brooklyn had a post office until it closed on November 19, 2011; it still has its own ZIP code, 36429.

Demographics

Brooklyn was listed as an unincorporated community on the 1880 U.S. Census as having a population of 67. It was the only time it was listed on the census.

References

Unincorporated communities in Conecuh County, Alabama
Unincorporated communities in Alabama